Gassan Ahadme Yahyai (born 17 November 2000) is a professional footballer who plays for English club Burton Albion, on loan from Ipswich Town, as a second-striker. Born in Spain, he represents Morocco at youth international level.

Club career

Early career
Born in Vic, Spain, Ahadme began his career with Norwich City, spending time on loan at Real Oviedo B. He moved on loan to Portsmouth in July 2021. He scored his first goal for the club on 9 November 2021 in an EFL Trophy tie against Crystal Palace U21s.

Burton Albion
He signed for Burton Albion in January 2022. He scored his first goal for the club in a 2–1 loss to former club Portsmouth on 8 February 2022. Ahadme would later score the fastest goal for Burton Albion in the EFL in a 4–3 defeat to Cambridge United, scoring in 11 seconds.

Ipswich Town
Ahadme joined Ipswich Town on 1 September 2022. He scored his first goal for the club in an FA Cup tie against Buxton on 27 November 2022. He returned on loan to Burton Albion in January 2023.

International career
Born in Spain, he represents Morocco at youth international level.

Career statistics

References

External links

2000 births
Living people
Spanish footballers
Norwich City F.C. players
Real Oviedo Vetusta players
Portsmouth F.C. players
Burton Albion F.C. players
Ipswich Town F.C. players
Segunda División B players
English Football League players
Association football forwards
Spanish expatriate footballers
Spanish expatriates in England
Expatriate footballers in England
Moroccan footballers
Morocco youth international footballers
Spanish people of Moroccan descent